Sajida Syed is a Pakistani actress. She is known for her roles in dramas Mere Khudaya, Darr Khuda Say, Khaas, Ab Dekh Khuda Kya Karta Hai, Saas Bahu, Jalan and Munafiq.

Early life
Sajida was born on November 4, 1960 in Karachi, Pakistan. She graduated from University of Karachi with bachelor degree.

Career
Sajida made her debut as an actress in 1980 on PTV. She appeared in dramas on PTV Channel. She was known for doing kind lead roles. She was known for her work in PTV drama Ana. She also appeared in drama Khaas in 2019. In 2020 she appeared in dramas Munafiq, Mohabbat Tujhe Alvida and Jalan.

Filmography

Television

Telefilm

References

External links
 
 

1960 births
Living people
20th-century Pakistani actresses
Pakistani television actresses
21st-century Pakistani actresses